Acosta is a small lunar impact crater located just to the north of the prominent crater Langrenus, near the east edge of Mare Fecunditatis. To the west are the trio of Atwood, Naonobu, and Bilharz. Acosta is named after the Portuguese naturalist Cristóvão da Costa.

The crater is circular and bowl-shaped, with a small interior floor at the midpoint of the sloping inner walls.  This crater was designated Langrenus C prior to being renamed by the IAU.

References

External links
 

Impact craters on the Moon